Thofania d'Adamo or Teofania di Adamo, Epifania d'Adamo or La Tofania (died 12 July 1633, Palermo) was an Italian poisoner.

Case
She was executed for having poisoned her late spouse Francesco d'Adamo and for having trafficked in illegal lethal poison. She was preceded by Francesca La Sarda, who was executed for having trafficked in illegal lethal poison the year prior. The two women were accused to have sold poison together in Palermo. The case attracted a lot of attention and the investigation was conducted on the orders of Fernando Afán de Ribera.

Legacy
The case is first mentioned in the Compendio di diversi successi in Palermo dall’anno 1632 by Baldassare Zamparrone (1581-1648). The contemporary diarist Gaetano Alessis described in Notizie piacevoli e curiose ossia aneddoti…, in which he claimed that the poison Aqua Tofana was invented by her and named after her.

Thofania d'Adamo are known in history as the alleged mother of the famous poisoner Giulia Tofana, who is claimed to be her daughter, who named the poison Aqua Tofana after her mother and fled to Rome after the execution of her mother, where she founded a new business selling poison. In reality, this appear to have been a myth originated in a hypothesis from the 19th-century.  Giulia Tofana, whose actual name was Giulia Mangiardi, left Palermo for Rome in 1624 and do appear to have founded a business selling poison there, which she eventuelly left to her stepdaughter Gironima Spana. However, there is nothing to indicate that Thofania d'Adamo was the mother of Giulia Mangiardi, but she may have been her disciple.

References

Philip Wexler, Toxicology in the Middle Ages and Renaissance

1633 deaths
17th-century Italian businesswomen
17th-century Italian businesspeople
17th-century Italian criminals
17th-century executions
Executed Italian serial killers
Executed Italian women
Italian female serial killers
Mariticides
People executed by Italy by hanging
People executed by the Kingdom of Sicily
People executed for witchcraft
People from Palermo
Poisoners